Korshikov is a surname. Notable people with the surname include:

  (author abbreviation: Korshikov, 1889–1942), Ukrainian botanist
 Gennadi Korshikov (born 1949), Russian rower
 Anna Korshikova (born 1982), Kyrgyz swimmer

Russian-language surnames